Dakra massacre refers to the massacre of unarmed Hindu refugees at the village of Dakra, in the Bagerhat sub-division of Khulna District on 21 May 1971 by the Peace Committee members and the Razakars. The attackers were led by Rajab Ali Fakir, the chairman of the Bagerhat sub-divisional Peace Committee. More than 2,000 Hindu men, women and children were killed in the massacre.

Background 
The village of Dakra is located in Perikhali Union under Rampal Upazila of Bagerhat District in Khulna Division of Bangladesh. In 1971, Bagerhat District was a sub-division within the Khulna District. Dakra is located on the south bank of the Mongla river, which flows towards the west and falls into the Pasur river near Mongla port. On the north bank of Mongla river, exactly opposite Dakra, lies the Krishnaganj market under Banshtali Union. Dakra was a predominantly Hindu village, having a famous Kali temple. In Dakra lived Badal Chakraborty also known as Noa Thakur, a spiritual person respected by all.

After the launch of Operation Searchlight, Peace Committee and Razakar force was organized in Khulna. In April, the Razakars began to persecute the Hindus and loot their properties. By the middle of May, thousands of Hindus from Pirojpur, Jhalokathi, Barguna and Barisal Sadar sub-divisions of undivided Barisal district and Bagerhat sub-division of undivided Khulna district began to use Dakra as the transit, while fleeing to India. On 21 May, an estimated 10,000 Hindu refugees were stranded in Dakra.

Killings 
In the afternoon, a group of 20 to 25 Razakars under the leadership of Rajab Ali Fakir arrived in Dakra in two boats. The first boat crossed the Kaliganj market and proceeded towards Madartali canal. The second boat proceeded along the Kumarkhali canal and then made a sudden turn towards Dakra along the Madartali canal. The Razakars from the second boat got down and started firing at the crowd. In the meanwhile, the Razakars from the first boat too got down and proceeded to the Kali temple, firing indiscriminately at the crowd. The crowd started running for cover. Many jumped to the river and were shot at. More than 150 persons were shot in the river. The Razakars resorts to loot, arson and rape in the villages. The beautiful women were taken captives for sexual slavery.

Prosecution 
The Government of Bangladesh brought war crime charges against Jamaat-e-Islami leader AKM Yusuf at the International Crimes Tribunal. Yusuf has been charged with genocide of the Bengali Hindu people and has been held directly responsible for the Dakra massacre.

Memorial 
No memorial has been built in Dakra to commemorate the victims. In 2010, Dakra Ganahatya Smriti Sangrakshan Parishad held a program to commemorate the victims of the Dakra massacre.

References 

1971 Bangladesh genocide
Massacres in 1971
1971 in Bangladesh
1971 in Pakistan
Massacres of Bengali Hindus in East Pakistan
Massacres committed by Pakistan in East Pakistan
May 1971 events in Asia